Darby Jones (February 10, 1910 – November 30, 1986) was an American actor known for his role as the zombie-like Carrefour in the 1943 horror film I Walked with a Zombie. He appeared in a similar role in the 1945 film Zombies on Broadway. He had uncredited appearances in the 1937 films Swing High, Swing Low and A Day at the Races, and his other roles include Broken Strings (1940), Virginia (1941), White Cargo (1942), and Zamba (1949). Jones also appeared in several Tarzan films, including the 1933 film serial Tarzan the Fearless, and the films Tarzan Escapes (1936) and Tarzan's New York Adventure (1942).

In 1991, film critic Danny Peary characterized Jones as having been "even more typecast than the typical black actor," relegated to roles in "jungle pictures." Jones's portrayal of Carrefour in I Walked with a Zombie has received praise and analysis, and has been described as iconic.

Early life
A native of Los Angeles, Jones broke the Los Angeles high jump record in 1929 at  while at Polytechnic High School.

Career

Early films
Jones made his acting debut in the 1933 film serial Tarzan the Fearless, in an uncredited role as the Head Bearer. In 1936, he appeared as Bomba in the film Tarzan Escapes. In 1937, he appeared in the romantic comedy film Swing High, Swing Low as a black Santa Claus lounging in a Panama café. That same year, he was a background extra in the Marx Brothers film A Day at the Races, appearing as a trumpet player during the "All God's Chillun Got Rhythm" number in the film.

In 1940, Jones played a yokel named Stringbeans Johnson in the film Broken Strings. In one scene, he dances to swing music at a nightclub, executing four midair splits among other dance moves. The following year, Jones appeared in Virginia as Joseph, a loyal servant on a plantation. In 1942, Jones appeared in Tarzan's New York Adventure in an uncredited role as a Swahili chief, and in White Cargo in a credited role as an obedient houseboy named Darby.

I Walked with a Zombie
In 1943, Jones appeared as the zombie-like Carrefour in horror film I Walked with a Zombie, directed by Jacques Tourneur and produced by Val Lewton. It is one of Jones's best-known roles, described as recognizable to fans of horror films. Historian and author Alexander Nemerov referred to Jones's portrayal of Carrefour as being a "monumental [...] dominant screen presence" in the film, which takes place on a Caribbean island called Saint Sebastian, home to a sugar plantation, a small white community, and descendants of African slaves, some of whom practice voodoo. Nemerov calls Carrefour a "disturbing figure—a sign of slavery past and present and of threats in the future." He characterizes Carrefour's image as "conjur[ing] the lynching of a black man", and writes that the character "suggests the violent subjugation and the emergent power of blacks" during World War II. As such, Nemerov called Jones "a minor actor granted extraordinary importance in a Lewton film". In 2019, Jim Vorel of Paste referred to Carrefour's "bug-eyed zombie visage" as "iconic [...] the kind of image that must have haunted the dreams of patrons for years to come".

The same year that I Walked with a Zombie was released, Jones appeared in two uncredited roles: a bellhop in Passport to Suez, and a cannibal in Sleepy Lagoon.

Later films
Two years after his appearance as Carrefour in I Walked with a Zombie, Jones played a similar role as the zombie Kolaga in the 1945 comedy horror film Zombies on Broadway. Unlike Carrefour, however, Kolaga commits acts of violence. In 1947, Jones appeared in The Macomber Affair in an uncredited role as a Masai warrior, and in 1949 he played Keega in the adventure film Zamba (also known as Zamba, the Gorilla). In 1957, Jones appeared in a minor role in the drama film Something of Value.

In 1991, film critic Danny Peary described Jones as having been "even more typecast than the typical black actor," writing that his roles were "limited to jungle pictures."

Selected filmography

References

Bibliography

Further reading

External links
 

20th-century American actors
1910 births
1986 deaths
African-American male actors
Male actors from Los Angeles
20th-century African-American people